Hannah Gadsby: Nanette is a live comedy performance written and performed by Australian comedian Hannah Gadsby, which debuted in 2017. The work includes social commentary (especially about LGBTQ and women's perspectives, and mental illness), evocative speech punctuated by comedy and emotive narration of Gadsby's life, lessons and what her story offers to the world. In June 2018, Netflix released a video of Gadsby's performance of the work at the Sydney Opera House, directed by Madeleine Parry and John Olb. The special was well-received by critics, winning a Peabody Award as well as Outstanding Writing for a Variety Special at the 2019 Primetime Emmy Awards.

Development
Gadsby created the stand-up show she named Nanette partly as a response to the public debate which took place in Australia before the law was changed to allow same-sex marriage, and soon after her diagnosis of ADHD and autism.

The show was originally named after a woman Gadsby had met, who she thought could be turned into an hour's worth of material. During the writing process, she realized this wasn't the case, but the name had already been chosen. She ended up ignoring this inconsistency and wrote an hour of material unrelated to Nanette. The initial shows were more combative with the audience, and made Gadsby feel victimised, so to get the audience more on her side, she added more jokes and relieved more tension throughout the show's run.

Synopsis

Gadsby uses Nanette to deconstruct the nature of comedy and its conventions by having her audience undergo the same tension in which marginalised people suffer on a daily basis. She shares personal anecdotes related to her experiences as a lesbian and gender-nonconforming woman, explaining how her comedic style is influenced by her identity. Due to Gadsby's upbringing in conservative Tasmania, she was raised surrounded by people who believed they had licence to hate others, which induced her at a young age to accept prejudiced views towards queer people. To deal with the social inequality she faced, Gadsby says that she turned to self-deprecating humour. She realised that the self-deprecating humour common to standup comedy is doubly painful for marginalised people because it adds another voice to the chorus of people who already insult and belittle them. This led her to conclude that she can no longer do standup comedy and so she structures the piece around claiming she is giving up comedy.

In addition to the stories she shares about her lesbian and gender-nonconforming experiences, Gadsby relates personal stories about her comedy career, family, and university experiences among other things. Gadsby expresses the need to use stories in her comedy because she is frustrated with the form of standup comedy. She does not feel as if her story, because her identity and victimisation do not fit comfortably into society's narrative, is being listened to properly. The representation of her story through Nanette affords Gadsby hope that her experiences will be "felt and understood by individuals with minds of their own," and that her story will finally be heard.

Gadsby discusses the mental health of Vincent van Gogh. Later, she talks about Pablo Picasso's contributions to Cubism and how she regards him as a misogynist artist.

Performances
Gadsby has performed Nanette throughout Australia, at the Edinburgh Festival Fringe, and in the United States. Her 2018 performances in New York City received positive reviews. The show was performed for the final time on 27 July 2018, in Montreal. On 20 June 2018, Netflix released a film of Gadsby's performance of the work at the Sydney Opera House under the title Hannah Gadsby: Nanette.

Reception
The site's critical consensus reads: "Hannah Gadsby: Nanette brilliantly moves modern comedy into nakedly honest new territory, pivoting from dry humor to raw, powerful storytelling." The performance has been described as a "game changer" for what comedy can achieve and has been called a form of "post comedy."

Daniel Fienberg of The Hollywood Reporter stated "Hannah Gadsby's Nanette stands alone...It's a detailed summation of joke construction that could be a textbook on its own. It's an art history lesson. It's hilarious, because Gadsby's timing and perspective fuel every sentence. It's painful, because Gadsby's emotions and perspective fuel every sentence." Ashley Hoffman in Time listed Nanette as the Best Stand Up Comedy Special of 2018, and added "Nanette kickstarted a global conversation, ensuring that her underrepresented perspective was finally seen and heard—and when Gadsby wrenches out her pain on stage, she reveals her strength, rage, and yes, winning humor." Anna Leszkiewicz in the New Statesman voiced praise for Nanette: "Gadsby's show is a tricksy, self-conscious beast, full of sleight of hand... It is a strange, rare thing: a comedy show that hopes you don't leave laughing."  Brian Logan of The Guardian helps to explain the significance and allure of Nanette by reporting, "Her show is about the power of stories and how, if the stories we tell ourselves are simplified or smoothed over, we leave unchallenged the wider stories society tells itself (in this case, about gender, sexuality and power)."  Helen Razer, writing in The Saturday Paper, wrote that Nanette "is very good...It is a worthy and well-paced specimen of a long-established form." However, Razer also added that she believed some American reviewers of Nanette had overpraised the show, saying "We cannot say that Gadsby’s Nanette definitively prescribes a style or ethics of remembering trauma. We can say that it’s pretty good."

By contrast, in The Outline magazine, P.E. Moskowitz gave Nanette a negative review, arguing that the special  "makes for boring, trite, and even dangerous art: in order to convey her trauma, Gadsby dismisses all of comedy, the uses of queer anger, and the entire premise of self-deprecation as inadequate". Soraya Roberts was also critical of Nanette in The Baffler magazine. Roberts stated "In terms of overall quality, Nanette is mediocre." Roberts took issue with Gadsby's rejection of comedy in the show, saying "Gadsby doesn't bend the medium, she abandons it." Roberts added that other female comedians, such as Mo’Nique and Maria Bamford, had made comedy specials about women's oppression without rejecting the act of telling jokes in the process.

Accolades
The show received widespread acclaim, including a 2018 Peabody Award.

References

Further reading

External links
 

Australian comedy television films
Australian LGBT-related television shows
2018 films
2010s feminist films
Lesbian culture in Australia
Lesbian feminist mass media
Stand-up comedy concert films
LGBT-related television films
Sydney Opera House
2018 LGBT-related films
2018 comedy films
Netflix specials
2010s English-language films